Gachchi (also called The Terrace) is a 2017 Marathi language Indian film. This film was directed by debutant Nachiket Samant and produced by Nitin Prakash Vaidya and Vidhi Kasliwal. The film stars Abhay Mahajan and Priya Bapat in lead roles. A Landmarc Films Presentation and a Nitin Vaidya Productions film, Gachchi was released in theatres on 22 December 2017.

Cast

 Priya Bapat as Keerti
 Abhay Mahajan as Shriram
 Asha Shelar as Shriram's Mother
 Anant Jog as Jagtap
 Mayureshwar Kale as Raju
 Swapnaneel Jaykar as Jagtap's Lawyer

Soundtrack

The songs were composed by Avinash Vishwajeet with lyrics by Priya Bapat and Abhay Mahajan.

References

External links

2010s Marathi-language films